Edward Hart Fenn (September 12, 1856 – February 23, 1939) was a U.S. Representative from Connecticut.

Biography
Born in Hartford, Connecticut, Fenn attended private schools, Hartford High School, and Yale University. Associated with the Hartford Post and the Hartford Courant as reporter, city editor, State editor, and special and editorial writer. Reported sessions of the Connecticut legislature from 1878 to 1908. He served as member of the State house of representatives in 1907 and 1915. He served in the State senate in 1909 and 1911. Fish and game commissioner 1912-1916. He served five years in the First Regiment of the Connecticut National Guard.

Fenn was elected as a Republican to the Sixty-seventh and to the four succeeding Congresses (March 4, 1921 – March 3, 1931). He served as chairman of the Committee on the Census (Sixty-ninth through Seventy-first Congresses). He was not a candidate for renomination in 1930. He retired from public life and lived in Washington, D.C., and Wethersfield, Connecticut. He died in Washington, D.C., on February 23, 1939. He was interred in Spring Grove Cemetery, Hartford, Connecticut.

References

External links

 

1856 births
1939 deaths
Military personnel from Connecticut
Republican Party members of the Connecticut House of Representatives
Republican Party Connecticut state senators
Republican Party members of the United States House of Representatives from Connecticut
Yale University alumni
Politicians from Hartford, Connecticut